The Cabinet-level officers of the executive branch of the government of Puerto Rico are the heads of the executive agencies that report directly to the Governor of Puerto Rico or to the Chief of Staff who also happen to not be Secretaries of an executive department nor members of an executive officeexcept for the Directors of the Office of Management and Budget and the Planning Board who are considered Cabinet-level officers. All the Cabinet-level officers are at the same bureaucratic level as of the Secretaries and together with the Council of Secretaries compose the Cabinet of Puerto Rico.

Officers

Notes

References

 
Members of the Cabinet of Puerto Rico